Lisa Frizell is a state representative from Castle Rock, Colorado. A Republican, Frizell represents Colorado House of Representatives District 45, which includes the Douglas County communities of Castle Rock, The Pinery, and Castle Pines Village.

Background
Frizell was elected to two four-year terms as Douglas County Assessor in 2014 and 2018. Prior to her election as assessor, she had worked in the assessor's office since 1998. She served a term as president of the Colorado Assessor's Association and served as chair and treasurer of the Castle Rock Chamber of Commerce. She grew up in Douglas County and graduated from Douglas County High School in Castle Rock. She also earned a bachelor's degree in engineering from the University of Colorado Boulder.

Elections
In the 2022 Colorado House of Representatives election, Frizell defeated her Democratic Party  opponent, winning 61.88% of the total votes cast.

References

External links
 Legislative website
 Campaign website

Living people
Republican Party members of the Colorado House of Representatives
Women state legislators in Colorado
21st-century American women politicians
People from Castle Rock, Colorado
County assessors in the United States
University of Colorado Boulder alumni
Year of birth missing (living people)
21st-century American politicians